The Amazing Tour Is Not on Fire, also known as TATINOF, is a quasi-fictional theatrical stage show and the first tour by YouTubers Dan and Phil (Daniel Howell and Phil Lester). It was performed as a companion to The Amazing Book Is Not on Fire (TABINOF).

The tour travelled around the United Kingdom during October and November 2015, ending with a show at the London Palladium. During the tour, they sung original song "The Internet Is Here", which they later released as a charity single for Stand Up To Cancer, earning them a gold record disc for the sales of the song.

In 2016, they took the tour to the US and Toronto, starting with a show in Orlando, Florida on 22 April and ended on 24 June with a show at the Dolby Theatre in Hollywood, California. It was the largest tour ever achieved by YouTube creators. They later toured Australia in August 2016, starting in Perth and ending in Brisbane, and finished the tour with a European leg, performing in Stockholm, Berlin, and Dublin.

Story
Phil quite literally breaks the Internet by microwaving his laptop in an experiment, exploding its contents like popcorn. As they attempt to fix the Internet, Dan and Phil bring their YouTube content past and present to the stage, forced by circumstance to learn how to entertain their audience and live without the very thing that made them.

Development
Planning began as early as 2014. Howell and Lester wrote and produced the show themselves, and then a crew helped them bring it to life. On 26 March 2015, they announced both their book and tour via a trailer on Howell's channel. A second trailer for the U.S. leg was released in February 2016.

YouTube Red originals and Dan and Phil Go Outside
In October 2016, The Amazing Tour Is Not on Fire, a live recording of the final U.S. show at the Dolby Theatre, was released as a YouTube Red Original film by the same name along with a documentary, Dan and Phil's Story of TATINOF. They were the first British YouTube creators to release content on the YouTube Red platform.

Alongside these films, they released a photo book, Dan and Phil Go Outside, in November 2016, which includes a personal collection of candid photos and insightful stories from the tour. The book became a #1 New York Times bestseller.

Tour dates

References

External links

Dan and Phil
Comedy tours